Ernest Frederick Smith (November 26, 1909 – April 25, 1985) was an American football tackle under coach Howard Jones at the University of Southern California (USC).  He also handled the placekicking and kickoff duties for the men of Troy. Smith was a member of Phi Sigma Kappa fraternity. He played prominent roles in the Trojan Rose Bowl triumphs over Tulane University as a junior and against University of Pittsburgh as a senior. While in college, he was a member of the Spirit of Troy as a trombone player.

He played professionally from 1935 to 1939 for the Green Bay Packers.

He was assistant football coach at Southern California two years, was a Major in the United States Air Force between 1940 and 1945, and became an insurance underwriter. He worked with the Boy Scouts, was on the Rose Bowl Committee, an officer of the Southern California Symphony, and president of the Los Angeles chapter of the National Football Foundation.

He was elected to the College Football Hall of Fame in 1970.  In 2001, Athlon Sports named Smith to the All-Time USC Football Team as a defensive lineman.

References

External links
NFL.com player page
 

1909 births
1985 deaths
All-American college football players
People from Spearfish, South Dakota
Players of American football from South Dakota
American football tackles
American football placekickers
USC Trojans football players
Green Bay Packers players
USC Trojans football coaches
United States Army Air Forces officers
United States Army Air Forces personnel of World War II